Bonanza is a city in Sebastian County, Arkansas, United States. It is part of the Fort Smith, Arkansas-Oklahoma Metropolitan Statistical Area. At the 2010 Census, the population of Bonanza was 575. According to the 2018 US Census Bureau estimates, the population of Bonanza was 564. Bonanza began as a coal mining town of the Central Coal and Coke company.

History 
On October 10, 1851, Sebastian County was created from parts of Crawford, Polk, and Scott County Arkansas placing Bonanza within the boundaries. Coal was discovered near the Arkansas-Oklahoma line about 12 miles southeast of Fort Smith. The Central Coal and Coke company laid tracks to the area in 1896 as part of the "St. Louis and San Francisco Railway". Bonanza sprang up as a company town. Mine #10 did not give good results but Mine #12 soon had 144 workers. Mine #20 employed 185 workers and Mine #26 employed 76 workers. The workers and their families soon reached a sizable number and C.C. Woodson filed a petition to incorporate and on November 26, 1898 the town was chartered.

Bonanza Race War
Around 200 citizens held a meeting with the purpose of removing black workers from the town. A resolution was passed “demanding that about forty negroes employed by Central Coal and Coke Company leave town.”. On April 30, 1904, there was a gun battle between black and white miners. It was reported that around 500 rounds were fired and the Arkansas Gazette reported on May 7, "nearly all black residents had left the city.".

Geography
Bonanza is located at  (35.237676, -94.428892).

According to the United States Census Bureau, the town has a total area of 3.2 km2 (1.2 mi2), all land.

Demographics

As of the census of 2000, there were 514 people, 199 households, and 151 families residing in the town.  The population density was 161.3/km2 (418.7/mi2).  There were 219 housing units at an average density of 68.7/km2 (178.4/mi2).  The racial makeup of the town was 95.72% White, 1.17% Native American, 0.19% from other races, and 2.92% from two or more races.  1.95% of the population were Hispanic or Latino of any race.

There were 199 households, out of which 26.6% had children under the age of 18 living with them, 59.8% were married couples living together, 8.5% had a female householder with no husband present, and 24.1% were non-families. 20.6% of all households were made up of individuals, and 9.0% had someone living alone who was 65 years of age or older.  The average household size was 2.58 and the average family size was 2.96.

In the town the population was spread out, with 23.7% under the age of 18, 8.4% from 18 to 24, 25.3% from 25 to 44, 28.6% from 45 to 64, and 14.0% who were 65 years of age or older.  The median age was 40 years. For every 100 females, there were 113.3 males.  For every 100 females age 18 and over, there were 107.4 males.

The median income for a household in the town was $30,809, and the median income for a family was $37,344. Males had a median income of $30,368 versus $17,500 for females. The per capita income for the town was $13,407.  About 6.7% of families and 7.8% of the population were below the poverty line, including 9.2% of those under age 18 and 11.5% of those age 65 or over.

Education
Almost all of the town is in the Hackett Public Schools. A small piece of land is in the Greenwood School District. The sole comprehensive high school of the Hackett district is Hackett High School.

See also

 List of cities in Arkansas

References

External links

Cities in Sebastian County, Arkansas
Cities in Arkansas
Fort Smith metropolitan area
Company towns in Arkansas
African-American history of Arkansas
Racially motivated violence against African Americans
Sundown towns in Arkansas